The 1952 United States presidential election in Maryland took place on November 4, 1952, as part of the 1952 United States presidential election. State voters chose nine representatives, or electors, to the Electoral College, who voted for president and vice president.

Maryland was won by Columbia University President Dwight D. Eisenhower (R–New York), running with Senator Richard Nixon, with 55.36% of the popular vote, against Adlai Stevenson (D–Illinois), running with Senator John Sparkman, with 43.83% of the popular vote.

Eisenhower became the first ever Republican presidential candidate to carry Queen Anne’s County.

Results

Results by county

Counties that flipped from Republican to Democratic
Allegany
Cecil
Dorchester
Kent
Prince George's
Queen Anne's
Somerset
Wicomico

See also
 United States presidential elections in Maryland
 1952 United States presidential election
 1952 United States elections

Notes

References 

Maryland
1952
Presidential